William Baer (born December 29, 1948) is an American writer, editor, translator, and academic. He has been the recipient of a Guggenheim Fellowship, a Fulbright (Portugal), and a Creative Writing Fellowship from the National Endowment for the Arts.

Early life and education 
William Baer was born in Geneva, New York, in 1948.  He was raised in The Bronx, New York City, and Wayne, New Jersey. After graduating from Rutgers University with a B.A. in English, he received an M.A. in English from New York University. He completed his doctoral dissertation in English at the University of South Carolina under the direction of James Dickey, before attending the Johns Hopkins Writing Seminars where he earned an M.A. in Creative Writing, working under David St. John and John Barth. He also graduated from USC School of Cinematic Arts with an M.A. in Cinema, receiving the Jack Nicholson Screenwriting Award.

Literary activities 
Baer is the author of six books of poetry, including The Unfortunates, recipient of the T. S. Eliot Poetry Prize; "Borges" and Other Sonnets; and "Bocage" and Other Sonnets, recipient of the X. J. Kennedy Poetry Prize.  His other books include translations from the Portuguese, Luís de Camões: Selected Sonnets; the textbook, Writing Metrical Poetry; and five collections of interviews, including Classic American Films: Conversations with the Screenwriters.

In 1989, William Baer was the Founding Editor of The Formalist (1990–2004), a small poetry journal which played a significant role in the Formalist poetry revival (New Formalism). He is also the former poetry editor and film critic for Crisis Magazine. Currently, he serves as the founding director of the St. Robert Southwell Institute, and previously he served as the director of the University of Evansville Press, the contributing editor at Measure, the faculty director of The Evansville Review, and the founding director of the Richard Wilbur Poetry Series, the Howard Nemerov Sonnet Award, and the Willis Barnstone Translation Prize.

In 1995, William Baer received an N.E.A. Creative Writing Grant in fiction, and his short stories have been widely published in such journals as The Iowa Review, Kansas Quarterly, The Chariton Review, and The Dalhousie Review. In 2015, two collections of his short fiction were published: Times Square and Other Stories and One-and-Twenty Tales. More recently, he published two novels: Companion and New Jersey Noir. 

William Baer's various plays have been produced at more than thirty American theaters, including the 13th Street Theatre in New York City, Chicago Dramatists, and the Metropolitan Playhouse of New York. A recent full-length drama, Three Generations of Imbeciles, received the New Works of Merit Playwriting Award and was chosen for the regionals of the 2013 Kennedy Center American College Theater Festival.

Awards 
 AACT NewPlayFest Award, 2015
 New Works of Merit Playwriting Award, 2011
 Guggenheim Fellowship, 2007
 X.J. Kennedy Poetry Prize, 2007
 Melvin M. Peterson Chair in Literature, 2006
 James H. Wilson Playwriting Award, 1999
 T.S. Eliot Poetry Prize, 1997
 N.E.A. Creative Writing Fellowship in Fiction, 1995
 Jack Nicholson Screenwriting Award, 1986
 Fulbright Lectureship in American Literature, Portugal, 1981

Selected books 
 New Jersey Noir, Able Muse Press, 2018
 Companion, James Ward Kirk Publishing, 2017
 Thirteen on Form: Conversations with Poets, Measure Press, 2016
 Love Sonnets, Kelsay Books, 2016
 Times Square and Other Stories, Able Muse Press, 2015
 One-and-Twenty Tales, Mockingbird Lane Press, 2015
 Psalter, Truman State University Press, 2011
 "Bocage" and Other Sonnets, Texas Review Press, 2008
 Classic American Films: Conversations with the Screenwriters, Praeger, 2007
 Rhyming Poems: A Contemporary Anthology, University of Evansville Press, 2007
 The Ballad Rode into Town, Turning Point, 2007
 Writing Metrical Poetry, Writer's Digest Books, 2006, Measure Press, 2015
 The Conservative Poets, University of Evansville Press, 2006
 Luís de Camões: Selected Sonnets, University of Chicago Press, 2005
 Sonnets: 150 Sonnets, University of Evansville Press, 2005
 Fourteen on Form: Conversations with Poets, University Press of Mississippi, 2004
 "Borges" and Other Sonnets, Truman State University Press, 2003
 Elia Kazan: Interviews, University Press of Mississippi, 2000
 The Amistad Case, Eldridge Publishing, 1998
 The Unfortunates, Truman State University Press, 1997
 Conversations with Derek Walcott, University Press of Mississippi, 1996

References

External links
 
 Poetry Foundation
 Guggenheim
 Poets and Writers
 Southwell 
 Measure Press
 Measure Press Staff

Formalist poets
Living people
1948 births
Rutgers University alumni
New York University alumni
University of South Carolina alumni
USC School of Cinematic Arts alumni
University of Evansville faculty
People from Geneva, New York